Pashyovo is a rural locality (a village) in Osintsevskoye Rural Settlement, Kishertsky District, Perm Krai, Russia. The population was 91 as of 2010.

Geography 
Pashyovo is located 38 km east of Ust-Kishert (the district's administrative centre) by road. Borovchata is the nearest rural locality.

References 

Rural localities in Kishertsky District